Fight Song (or songs) or The Fight Song (or songs) may refer to:

 Fight song, at times team anthem, team song or games song, a song associated with a professional and amateur sports team
 "Fight Song" (Rachel Platten song), 2015
 Fight Song (EP), Platten's 2015 extended play featuring the song
 Fight Songs (Old 97's album), 1999
 Fight Songs (Billy Bragg album), 2011
 Fight Songs (EP), a 1995 EP by The For Carnation
 "The Fight Song" (Marilyn Manson song), 2000
 "The Fight Song" (Sanctus Real song), 2004
 "The Fight Song" (Washington State University), the school's fight song

See also
 "Fight" (song), the Moldovan entry in the Eurovision Song Contest 2007, performed in English by Natalia Barbu